The 1989 European Sambo Championships was the second International European Sambo Championships competition of its kind and it was held in Herne Bay, England.

Medal overview

References

European Sambo Championships
1989 in sambo (martial art)
International sports competitions hosted by England
Sport in Kent